Lin Chin-tien is a Taiwanese politician. He served as the Political Deputy Minister of Culture in the Executive Yuan of the Republic of China from 20 May 2012 to 4 July 2013.

See also
 Culture of Taiwan

References

Living people
Taiwanese Ministers of Culture
Year of birth missing (living people)